The Islampur–Patna Express is an Express train belonging to East Coast Railway zone that runs between  and  in India. It is currently being operated with 18696/18695 train numbers on a daily basis.

Service

The 18695/Islampur–Patna Express has an average speed of 32 km/h and covers 65 km in 2h. The 18696/Patna–Islampur Express has an average speed of 26 km/h and covers 65 km in 2h 30m.

Route & Halts 

The important halts of the train are:

Coach composition

The train has standard ICF rakes with a max speed of 110 km/h. The train consists of 21 coaches:

 1 First AC 
 1 AC II Tier
 2 AC III Tier
 9 Sleeper Coaches
 5 General Unreserved
 2 Seating cum Luggage Rake

Traction

Both trains are hauled by a Mughalsarai-based WAP-4 electric locomotive from Patna to Islampur & vice versa.

Rake sharing

The train shares its rake with 18621/18622 Patna–Hatia Express.

See also 

 Patna Junction railway station
 Islampur railway station
 Patna–Hatia Express

Notes

References

External links 

 18695/Islampur–Patna Express
 18696/Patna–Islampur Express

Transport in Patna
Express trains in India
Rail transport in Bihar
Defunct trains in India